Raisa Žuk-Hryškievič (née Žukoŭskaja; 22 October 1919 – 2 April 2009) was a prominent figure of the Belarusian diaspora.

Early life 

Žuk-Hryškievič was born on 22 October 1919 in Pružany (then Brest district within the Civil Administration of the Eastern Lands, a temporary Polish administrative region existing in 1919–20; now Brest Region of Belarus).  

She finished a Polish primary school and Adam Mickiewicz gymnasium in her native Pružany before enrolling in the Belarusian Gymnasium in Vilna. In 1939 she embarked on a teaching career.

In 1949 Žuk-Hryškievič settled in the Canada. In 1953 she married Vincent Žuk-Hryškievič, a deputy chair of the Rada of the Belarusian Democratic Republic, and in 1954 graduated from the University of Toronto with a degree in dental surgery.

Public life in the Belarusian diaspora 
Apart from a successful dental practice, Žuk-Hryškievič became an active participant in Belarusian public life in Canada.

In 1973 as a representative of the Belarusian community Žuk-Hryškievič was invited by the Canadian government to join the Canadian Consultative Council on Multiculturalism.

In 1978 she became a member of the Rada of the Belarusian Democratic Republic and in 1997 a member of the Rada's Executive Council.

Belarusian Cross and Memorial at the Martyrs' Shrine 

In 1988 Žuk-Hryškievič and her husband were instrumental in the erection of a memorial cross at the Martyrs' Shrine in Midland, Ontario. The cross was installed in commemoration of the first millennium of Christianity in Belarus and shortly followed by an adjacent monument dedicated to victims of the Communist terror in Belarus.

The cross and monument were sanctified by Mgr Alexander Nadson, Apostolic Visitor for Belarusian Catholics abroad.

The cross is used as a place of pilgrimage by the Belarusian community in Canada.

Death and resting place 

See also

Archives 
There is a Raisa Zuk-Hryskievic fonds at Library and Archives Canada. The archival reference number is R4894.

References

Further reading 

 Здановіч Іван Юльянавіч. Рупліўцы беларускага нацыянальнага адраджэння з Пружаншчыны: Грамадска-літаратурны даведнік. - Пружаны, 2003. - С. 32–34.
 Юрэвіч, Л. Шматгалосы эпісталярыум : гісторыя людзей і ідэй на эміграцыі ў ліставанні / Лявон Юрэвіч. — (Бібліятэка Бацькаўшчыны; кн. 20). - Мінск: Кнігазбор, 2012. - 660 с. -ISBN 978-985-7007-43-1.

1919 births
2009 deaths
Belarusian diaspora
Members of the Rada of the Belarusian Democratic Republic
Soviet emigrants to Canada